Allogona townsendiana, common name the Oregon forestsnail, is a species of air-breathing land snail, a terrestrial pulmonate gastropod mollusk in the family Polygyridae.

Distribution and conservation status 
This snail species lives in British Columbia in Canada, and it is endangered species there. The Canadian Species at Risk Act listed it in the List of Wildlife Species at Risk as being endangered in Canada.

References

External links 

 Video: Live Oregon Forestsnail discovered at the Little Campbell River (British Columbia)

Polygyridae